Rising Above (2007) was the inaugural Rising Above professional wrestling pay-per-view (PPV) event promoted by Ring of Honor. It took place on December 29, 2007 from the Manhattan Center in New York, New York and first aired on March 7, 2008.

Results

See also
2007 in professional wrestling
List of Ring of Honor pay-per-view events

References

External links
ROHwrestling.com

Events in New York City
2007 in New York City
ROH Rising Above
Professional wrestling in New York City
December 2007 events in the United States
2007 Ring of Honor pay-per-view events